Roosevelt Roads Naval Station is a former United States Navy base in the town of Ceiba, Puerto Rico. The site operates today as José Aponte de la Torre Airport, a public use airport.

History
In 1919, future US President Franklin D. Roosevelt, then Assistant Secretary of the Navy, toured Puerto Rico, visiting Ceiba. When he returned to the White House, he expressed a liking for the terrain where the base was to be located. This was during the World War I era, and the US could benefit from an air field in Ceiba. While Puerto Rico is a Commonwealth, its territorial rights belong to the US, which made it feasible for the US government to build an air base in Ceiba.

It took many years for the US to become convinced of the need for an air base in Ceiba. When Adolf Hitler and Nazi Germany began to invade other European countries, the US, led by then President Roosevelt, considered the idea of a naval air station in Ceiba. With war in the European and Pacific theatres, they saw an airbase in the Caribbean as necessary. President Roosevelt ordered the creation of the base in 1940. In 1941, $50 million (equivalent to $ million in ) was appropriated to develop a protected anchorage in the sea area between Puerto Rico and Vieques, an area later named Roosevelt Roads by Navy Secretary Frank Knox on 15 May 1941. On 22 August 1941, President Roosevelt signed a naval works among other things, authorized another $21.97 million (equivalent to $ million in ) for a protected fleet anchorage at Roosevelt Roads.

The base had been inaugurated, but scaled down to maintenance status with a public works office in 1944. From then until 1957, the base endured many shifts, being opened seven times and closed eight times. Meanwhile, it continued as a source of employment for the citizens of Ceiba.

In 1957, it was upgraded to Naval Station status. Fort Bundy was located there, but it crossed over to parts of Vieques, a fact that became important in the future. A US military mission, the M3, was located there. It was part of the "Naval Computer and Telecommunications Station, Puerto Rico Base Communication Department". M3 had a fleet center, a technical control facility and a Tactical support communications department among other things. The M3 was designated to help Puerto Rico, the US and other Caribbean and Latin American countries to deal with drug trafficking, illegal immigration and other problems. The main purpose of the base was tactical support for land/sea/air maneuvers on Vieques Island.

In 1969, the US Navy established Camp Moscrip which held a rotating US Navy Construction Battalion (Seabee).

For the next 47 years the base was utilized for flight practice, as well as other missions and control of the area's air space. In August 2002, a MC-130H airplane carrying seven airmen crashed in the town of Caguas, while en route from Roosevelt Roads to Rafael Hernández Airport in Aguadilla. All seven perished, in the largest air tragedy in Caguas's history.

Within the industrial area the drydock, a bombproof power plant, a sewage pumping station, and a machine shop were completed. The drydock, 1100 by 155 feet, and built in the dry, was first used  in July 1943. The power plant, a bombproof structure with 4-foot-thick concrete walls, was equipped with two 5,000-kw steam-driven generators.  The drydock was dedicated on 15 February 1944, and the Bolles Drydock, in memory of Captain Harry A. Bolles, (CEC) USN, who was killed in Alaska in World War II.

In 2003, a military appropriations bill required the Secretary of the Navy to close within six months of the enactment of the act. The base officially closed on 31 March 2004. At the time, there were nearly 1,200 active-duty officers and sailors at Roosevelt Roads. United States Special Operations Command South moved from Roosevelt Roads to Homestead Air Reserve Base. U.S. Naval Forces Southern Command moved from Roosevelt Roads to Mayport Naval Station. Naval Mobile Construction Battalion (NMCB) 74 (Seabee) moved from Roosevelt Roads to Little Creek, Virginia. When Roosevelt Roads closed, the only U.S. naval base in the Caribbean was the Guantanamo Bay Naval Base. From the time that Congress voted to close the base until its closure, Roosevelt Roads closed faster than any other military installation on US soil in several decades. After its closure, 200 sailors and civilians remained to help in the transition from a naval base to a naval agency coordinating the closing process.

Of the former base's property, about 30% was transferred to the government of Puerto Rico and its municipalities, 40% became a wetlands preserve, and the remainder was offered for sale at public auction.

US Naval Forces Southern Command 

U.S. Naval Forces Southern Command (NAVSO) directs naval forces and interacts with partner nations to shape the maritime environment within United States Southern Command's Area of Focus (AOF). With a focus on Theater Security Cooperation, NAVSO works to strengthen and build effective alliance and friendships, develop partner nation capabilities, and maintain US operational access to defend the US.

U.S. Naval Forces Southern Command (COMUSNAVSO), headquartered at Naval Station Roosevelt Roads, Puerto Rico, was the Naval Component Commander to the U.S. Southern Command, based in Miami, Florida. It provides strategic and operational command and control for U.S. Naval Forces in South America, Central America and the Caribbean.

On 10 December 1999 the US Navy established Commander, U.S. Naval Forces Southern Command, also known as NAVSOUTH, in a ceremony aboard  inport Roosevelt Roads. The new organization is responsible for Navy operational forces in the United States Southern Command's area of responsibility (AOR), including Naval Special Warfare Unit Four, a training detachment for SEAL teams from the SOCOM operational area. It oversees US naval forces participating in drug enforcement operations and interaction with South American naval forces, including the annual UNITAS operations around South America. As the Navy's senior representative, Commander, United States Naval Forces, Southern Command (COMUSNAVSO) serves as the principal liaison with the government of Puerto Rico. In January 2004 The Navy decided to relocate U.S. Naval Forces Southern Command (USNAVSO) from Naval Station Roosevelt Roads, Puerto Rico, to Naval Station Mayport, Florida. Since the Navy had to close Naval Station Roosevelt Roads by 31 March 2004, relocation of USNAVSO was a high priority.

Life on Roosevelt Roads

 
Roosevelt Roads Naval Station, or Roosey (pronounced "Rosy") as it was frequently called, was home to hundreds of military personnel and dependents. Education for children of those based at the Station was initially provided by teachers who were DOD contractors from the US. Later, more local teachers were hired.

Radio and TV entertainment on the base during the mid-1970s was limited. News and information broadcasts were provided by Navy and Marine Corps journalists from the studios of The American Forces Caribbean Network (AFCN). Families could tune into the on-base AFRTS radio and TV station's family-oriented shows, or rig an antenna for signals from St. Thomas or San Juan. At one time, the AFCN operated repeater transmitters broadcasting radio and TV to San Juan, and Ramey Air Force Base, located on the west coast of Puerto Rico.

At the El Coqui Theater, in the Bundy area of the base, movie goers watched films as swifts, a small batlike bird, flitted across the screen. Bats were abundant on the island, but the brightly-lit screen attracted these small birds whose stiff-winged flight was easily distinguishable from the flutter of a bat. Birds hunt using superior eyesight and the projector provided welcome light for them in the darkened theater while bats who depend on echo-location do not need it and were seen only incidentally. But both served as first-class controls on the persistent infestation of mosquitoes (and Mimis, an almost invisible biting midge with a most painful bite) encountered everywhere on the island.

The base equestrian stables were near the golf course aka:Lake Bundy. Most of the 'horses' were technically ponies, although several thoroughbreds, washouts from race tracks, occasionally found a home on base.
 
The base flying club had many members, and met regularly to plan trips and activities. Flight instruction was available to all members.

The Vieques effect

In 1999, David Sanes, a civilian employed as a security guard by the US Navy, died from a stray bomb while observing a routine exercise. As a consequence of this and the high rate of cancer (causation unconfirmed) among residents of Vieques many Vieques citizens and Puerto Rican activists from other towns (Ruben Berrios, Tito Kayak, etc.) began activism against the military presence in Vieques, which included illegally entering the live -fire areas at the military reservation. Other important activists included Jesse Jackson, Robert Kennedy Jr., Al Sharpton, US Representative Luis Gutiérrez D-IL, US Representative Nydia Velázquez D-NY, Rigoberta Menchú and Edward James Olmos (the last was jailed in Puerto Rico for trespassing on federal property). An agreement between the Clinton Administration and the Government of Puerto Rico (then Gov. Rosello) agreed to cease all live bombing on Vieques by March 2003.

Fort Bundy was affected by the protests, because part of it was in Vieques. After Sanes' death, there was a struggle between the (State equivalent) constitutional Government of Puerto Rico and the US Government. This was over after President George W. Bush granted Puerto Rico the rights to operate the former military possessions in Vieques, including Fort Bundy, a portion of which was aboard Roosevelt Roads Naval Station. As a consequence of President Bush's decision, the Roosevelt Roads Naval Station became NAPR (Naval Activity Puerto Rico), where DoD Police provides security, but is a military installation. On 31 March 2004, the station again became inoperative.

The future
After the military left the station, Puerto Rican Governor Sila María Calderón announced that her party, the PPD, had political goals to turn the base into an international airport. This was backed in 2005 by the then-new Governor, Aníbal Acevedo Vilá, who asserted that the area might be converted to an airport. He also stated that Ceiba as a town would serve as an economic and tourist center for eastern Puerto Rico, and that converting the former military base into a civil airport would be part of a plan to open seven or eight large airports in Puerto Rico.

The remaining portion is in the process of being conveyed to the Commonwealth of Puerto Rico and other Federal agencies in various stages. Since November 2008, Puerto Rico Ports Authority operates the José Aponte de la Torre Airport.

In 2012, the former Roosevelt Roads Naval Station was under consideration as a possible location for the SpaceX private launch site, but was not selected.

The CBP Air and Marine Operations began marine operations at a new facility at Roosevelt Roads Naval Station on 30 August 2018.

Marine Environmental Remediation (MER) Group signed an agreement with the LRA to rent Pier 3 as a ship recycling facility in April 2016.  MER Group is the first true GREEN recycling facility within the US.  There are currently three ships, Seven Polaris, Lone Star and the Atlantic VII, at the pier for recycling.  The company will bring over 700 jobs to the local area.

As of October 2018, Ricardo Rosselló's administration made it the launching port to Vieques and Culebra

In mid-March 2020, José Aponte Hernández, a former Speaker of the House of Representatives of Puerto Rico said he would request from Jenniffer González Colón, (the resident commissioner of Puerto Rico) for funds to restore a former hospital to operational status. What was discussed was the possibility of using the former hospital located on the Roosevelt Roads Naval Station to treat persons affected by the COVID-19 pandemic in Puerto Rico.

Hurricane Maria rescue
In 2017, Roosevelt Roads military personnel arrived at Roosevelt Roads after Hurricane Maria to assist in rescue efforts. Units such as the United States Air Force 821st Contingency Response Support Squadron, 821st Contingency Response Group, the United States Army 1st Armored Division Aviation Brigade and the 101st Airborne Division "Dustoff" unit arrived at Roosevelt Roads. Marines and sailors set up a supply staging base receiving around-the-clock airlifts at Roosevelt Roads. This was the first major military activity at Roosevelt Roads since 2004.

US Army Reserve, Army National Guard and remaining military activities

The United States Armed Forces keep some portions of the former Roosevelt Roads Naval Base including 54 acres transferred for the Reserve Component of the United States Army that includes the existing Roosevelt Roads US Army Reserve Center and an Armed Forces Reserve Center (AFRC).

The Roosevelt Roads Armed Forces Reserve Center was opened 10 September 2011. This facility with  can serve 600 personnel on a rotating basis 345 service members per weekend. This AFRC includes a vehicle maintenance shop, storage building, weapons simulator, learning center, wash bay and parking.

The Armed Forces Reserve Center at Roosevelt Roads accommodates the United States Army Reserve the 973rd Water Support Company and The Puerto Rico Army National Guard 7 FT Landing Craft Detachment, 380th Engineer Platoon, 232nd Engineering Dive Team and a Recruiting/Retention Office.

This facility serves about 600 service members on a rotating basis with the maximum expected use of the facility being about 245 Reserve and Army Guard members per weekend.

The Roosevelt Roads US Army Reserve Center is home for the 346th Transportation Battalion, the 390th Seaport Operations Company, the 273rd Transportation Detachment Movement Control, the 432 Transportation MDM Truck Company (CGO) (EAB LINEHAUL), the 5th Battalion Army Reserve Career Group, the 764 TM Field Feeding TM, the 969 Quartermaster Detachment Petroleum Liaison Team and the 756th Engineering Construction Company.

The US Army Reserve Boat Maintenance Facility located at Ensenada Honda bay was transferred to the Puerto Rico National Guard Landing Craft Detachment, 191st Regional Support Group.

A small US Navy Reserve Support Detachment, of mostly recruiters and just over a dozen support personnel.

The Atlantic Fleet Weapons Training Facility (AFWTF) Drone Launch Facility at Cabras Island operating under the United States Coast Guard.

See also

Military history of Puerto Rico

References

External links 
 GlobalSecurity.org profile
 Roosevelt Roads
 Association of Defense Communities

Naval Stations of the United States Navy
Military installations closed in 2004
Military history of Puerto Rico
Ceiba, Puerto Rico
Closed military facilities in Puerto Rico
1943 establishments in Puerto Rico
Military installations established in 1943